Paul Aaron Lindblad (August 9, 1941 – January 1, 2006) was an American Major League Baseball left-handed middle-relief pitcher. During his career, he pitched primarily for the Kansas City / Oakland Athletics. At the time of his retirement in 1978, he had recorded the seventh-most appearances (655) of any left-hander in history.

Lindblad was born in Chanute, Kansas. A member of three World Series championship teams, he was a solid left-handed specialist in the American League for 14 seasons. A very fine fielder as well, he set a major league record by playing from 1966 to 1974 without making an error in 385 games.

Lindblad was signed by the Kansas City Athletics in 1962, who moved to Oakland in 1968. His most productive season came in 1969, when he posted career highs with nine wins and nine saves. A year later he followed with an 8–2 mark, and in the 1971 midseason he was traded to the Washington Senators, who became the Texas Rangers a year later. With Texas, he led American League pitchers with 66 appearances in 1972. He returned to Oakland at the end of the season.

Lindblad was the winning pitcher for Oakland in Game Three of the 1973 World Series against the New York Mets, by working shutout baseball in the ninth and tenth innings. In the 10th, he became the last pitcher faced by future Hall of Famer Willie Mays, who grounded out as a pinch-hitter.

In 1975, Lindblad had a 9–1 record with seven saves. On the final day of the regular season, he combined with Vida Blue, Glenn Abbott, and Rollie Fingers on a no-hitter against the California Angels. He appeared in two games against the Boston Red Sox in the ALCS.

Lindblad came back to Texas for part of two seasons and made his final majors appearance with the New York Yankees in Game One of the 1978 World Series. He finished his career with a 68–63 record and 64 saves in 665 games. He posted a 3.29 ERA and struck out 671 batters in 1,213 innings pitched.

Following his playing career, Lindblad joined the minor league baseball system as a pitching coach, and also worked as a custom home builder for several years.

Lindblad died in 2006 from Alzheimer's disease in Arlington, Texas at the age of 64.

References

External links

Paul Lindblad at Baseball Almanac
Paul Lindblad at Baseball Biography
 Paul Lindblad Obituary at Baseball Toaster

Paul Lindblad at Pura Pelota (Venezuelan Professional Baseball League)

1941 births
2006 deaths
Baseball players from Kansas
Birmingham Barons players
Burlington Bees players
Neurological disease deaths in Texas
Deaths from Alzheimer's disease
Florida Instructional League Athletics players
Leones del Caracas players
American expatriate baseball players in Venezuela
Major League Baseball pitchers
Kansas City Athletics players
New York Yankees players
Oakland Athletics players
People from Chanute, Kansas
Texas Rangers players
Vancouver Mounties players
Washington Senators (1961–1971) players
Neosho County Panthers baseball players